The National Institute of Applied Sciences and Technology (INSAT) is a Tunisian institute that is affiliated with the University of Carthage.Admission is very competitive and generally students must hold a very good GPA on the national exam to be admitted. 
Training technicians and engineers, it provides a post-baccalaureate education over a period of three and five years. Starting with two main branches CBA in French or ACB  (Applied-Chemistry-Biology) and MPI in French or MPC (Math-Physics-Computer science) for the first year of integrated preparatory cycle, further branching to 2 tracks for ACB students, and 4 tracks for MPC students.

References

External links

 

1992 establishments in Tunisia
Universities in Tunisia
Scientific organisations based in Tunisia
Educational institutions established in 1992